Povodimovo (Povodele) is a rural locality (a selo) in Dubyonsky District of the Republic of Mordovia, Russia with a population of

References

Rural localities in Mordovia
Dubyonsky District, Republic of Mordovia